is a small asteroid and Mars trojan orbiting near the  of Mars (60 degrees behind Mars on its orbit).

Discovery, orbit and physical properties
 was first observed on 21 March 2018 by the Mt. Lemmon Survey, but it had already been imaged (but not identified as an asteroid) by the Pan-STARRS 1 telescope system at Haleakala on the previous night. Its orbit is characterized by very low eccentricity (0.017), moderate inclination (22.1°) and a semi-major axis of 1.52 AU. Upon discovery, it was classified as Mars-crosser by the Minor Planet Center. Its orbit is reasonably well determined as it is currently (January 2021) based on 35 observations with a data-arc span of 790 days.  has an absolute magnitude of 21.3 which gives a characteristic diameter of 200 m.

Mars trojan and orbital evolution
Recent calculations indicate that it is a stable  Mars trojan with a libration period of 1300 yr and an amplitude of 20°. These values are similar to those of 5261 Eureka and related objects and it may be a member of the so-called Eureka family.

Mars trojan 
 (leading):
  †
 (trailing):
 5261 Eureka (1990 MB) †
  †
  †

See also

References 

Further reading
Three new stable L5 Mars Trojans de la Fuente Marcos, C., de la Fuente Marcos, R. 2013, Monthly Notices of the Royal Astronomical Society: Letters, Vol. 432, Issue 1, pp. 31–35.
Orbital clustering of Martian Trojans: An asteroid family in the inner solar system? Christou, A. A. 2013, Icarus, Vol. 224, Issue 1, pp. 144–153.

External links 
  data at MPC.
 
 

Mars trojans

Minor planet object articles (unnumbered)
20180321